Larne Technical College Old Boys Association Football Club, commonly known as Larne Tech Old Boys, is a Northern Irish, intermediate football club based in Larne, playing in the Premier Division of the Northern Amateur Football League. The club formed on 30 May 1950 by former pupils of the Larne Technical College. Since 1971, they have played their home matches at Dennis Harvey Park on the Upper Cairncastle Road, Larne. Johnny McCullough and Ciaran Kelly are the current Joint 1st Team Managers. There is also a second team currently playing in the NAFL Division 3A.

Club history 
The club was founded by James Henry Cathcart. Appointed to the position of Principal of Larne Technical School in 1947, he hoped to create an organization for former pupils of the college. At the same time, with his former experience in charge of the schools football team, he realised that there was no local teams outside of the Northern Ireland Churches League onto which his students could progress. The marriage of these two ideas was warmly welcomed at a meeting of ex-students of the college. Mr. Cathcart described it as a "natural progression" of the school football team and several of the lads who had been former club officers were elected to start the new team.

On 30 May 1950, Larne Technical Old Boys came into being and was accepted into the Northern Amateur Football League Division 2. Within a few years, the club had set up their own facilities and was fielding two teams a week. However, by the late 1960s membership of the club had dropped and the club was close to bankruptcy. In 1970 they had to give up their clubrooms in order to stay afloat. Soon interest in the club renewed and in 1971 they moved to their current home at Antville Playing Fields (later renamed Dennis Harvey Park in 2009). The team grew in stature and in 1976 they claimed their first Amateur League titles winning both the Border Regiment Cup and Templeton Cup. The pitch was upgraded in 1991 to allow them to compete in the Intermediate section of the NAFL. This was followed by two more Border Cup victories in 1998 and 2002.

Currently LTOB compete in the Premier Division of the NAFL, finishing the 2018/19 season as champions of Division 1A sealing the first league title in the club's history with a 3–1 final day win against Comber Rec.

Current squad

Honours 

 Northern Amateur Football League Border Regiment Cup: 3
1975–76, 1997–98, 2001–02
 Northern Amateur Football League Division 1A: 1
2018-19

External links 
 Larne Tech OB Official Club website
 nifootball.co.uk - (For fixtures, results and tables of all Northern Ireland amateur football leagues)

 

Association football clubs in Northern Ireland
Association football clubs established in 1950
Association football clubs in County Antrim
Northern Amateur Football League clubs
Larne
1950 establishments in Northern Ireland